Lee Glen Morrison (born 6 March 1932 in Vidora, Saskatchewan) is a Canadian politician, formerly a member of the House of Commons of Canada from 1993 to 2000.

He was first elected at the Swift Current—Maple Creek—Assiniboia electoral district in the 1993 federal election. After realignment of riding boundaries, he was re-elected at the Cypress Hills—Grasslands electoral district in the 1997 federal election. Morrison was a member of the Reform party, later renamed the Canadian Alliance. After serving in the 35th and 36th Canadian Parliaments, he did not seek a third term of office, leaving federal politics as of the 2000 federal election.

Electoral record

External links
 

1932 births
Living people
Canadian Alliance MPs
20th-century Canadian politicians
Members of the House of Commons of Canada from Saskatchewan
Reform Party of Canada MPs
People from Rural Municipality Reno No. 51, Saskatchewan